The 1998 Tulsa Golden Hurricane football team represented the University of Tulsa during the 1998 NCAA Division I-A football season. In their eleventh year under head coach David Rader, the Golden Hurricane compiled a 4–7 record.  The team's statistical leaders included quarterback John Fitzgerald with 1,457 passing yards, Reggie Williams and Charlie Higgins, each with 447 rushing yards, and Wes Caswell with 598 receiving yards.

Schedule

References

Tulsa
Tulsa Golden Hurricane football seasons
Tulsa Golden Hurricane football